The 1979 TAA Formula Ford Driver to Europe Series was an Australian motor racing competition open to Formula Ford racing cars. The series, which was the tenth national series for Formula Fords to be held in Australia, was won by Russell Norden driving a Mawer 004.

Series schedule
The series was contested over eight rounds.

Points system
Points were awarded on a 15, 12, 10, 8, 6, 5, 4, 3, 2, 1 basis for the first ten places at each round.

Series results 

Note: All cars were powered by 1600cc Ford production block engines.

References

TAA Formula Ford Driver to Europe Series
Australian Formula Ford Series